Carcelén is a municipality in Albacete, Castile-La Mancha, Spain. It has a population of 652.

Villages
Carcelén
Casas de Juan Gil

See also
Manchuela

References

Municipalities of the Province of Albacete